German submarine U-1168 was a Type VIIC/41 U-boat of Nazi Germany's Kriegsmarine during World War II.

She was ordered on 2 April 1942, and was laid down on 16 March 1943, at Danziger Werft AG, Danzig, as yard number 140. She was launched on 2 October 1943, and commissioned under the command of Oberleutnant zur See Martin Grasse on 19 January 1944.

Design
German Type VIIC/41 submarines were preceded by the heavier Type VIIC submarines. U-1168 had a displacement of  when at the surface and  while submerged. She had two shafts and two  propellers.

U-1168 was fitted with five  torpedo tubes (four fitted at the bow and one at the stern), fourteen torpedoes or 26 TMA or TMB Naval mines, one  SK C/35 naval gun, (220 rounds), one  Flak M42 and two  C/30 anti-aircraft guns. The boat had a complement of between forty-four and fifty-two.

Service history
The wreck was later broken up.

See also
 Battle of the Atlantic

References

Bibliography

German Type VIIC/41 submarines
U-boats commissioned in 1944
World War II submarines of Germany
1943 ships
Ships built in Danzig
Operation Regenbogen (U-boat)
Maritime incidents in May 1945
U-boats scuttled in 1945